Simone Sabouret (19 October 1893 – 31 October 1974) was a French figure skater. She competed at the 1920 Summer Olympics and the 1924 Winter Olympics.

References

External links
 

1893 births
1974 deaths
French female pair skaters
Olympic figure skaters of France
Figure skaters at the 1920 Summer Olympics
Figure skaters at the 1924 Winter Olympics
Figure skaters from Paris
20th-century French women